San Gabriel is a name of the capital city of San Gabriel parish in Montúfar Canton in Carchi Province of Ecuador. The city and parish are located in the Andes.

The city of San Gabriel had a population of 12,575 in 2001 and 14,487 in the 2010 census. The parish had a population of 19,230 in 2001 and 21,096 in the census of 2010.

San Gabriel was designated a Pueblo Mágico (magical town) by the Ecuadorian Ministry of Tourism (MINTUR) in 2019. It is one of the country's five original Pueblos Mágicos.

Notable people
 Olavo Yépez, (1937-2021), chess master.

Sources 
World-Gazetteer.com

References

Populated places in Carchi Province